Constitutional Assembly elections were held in Cuba on 5 March 1928. The result was a victory for the Liberal Party, which won 29 of the 55 seats.

Results

References

Cuba
Elections in Cuba
1928 in Cuba
March 1928 events
Election and referendum articles with incomplete results